USNS Patuxent (T-AO-201) is a  underway replenishment oiler operated by the Military Sealift Command to support ships of the United States Navy.

Patuxent, the fifteenth ship of the Henry J. Kaiser class, was laid down at Avondale Shipyard, Inc., at New Orleans, Louisiana, on 16 October 1991 and launched on 23 July 1994. She was the first of three ships in the class of eighteen—the other two being  and —to be built with a double hull required by the Oil Pollution Act of 1990.

Patuxent entered non-commissioned U.S. Navy service under the control of the Military Sealift Command with a primarily civilian crew on 21 June 1995. She serves in the United States Atlantic Fleet.

Design
The s were preceded by the shorter s.

They were built without armaments but can be fitted with close-in weapon systems. The ship has a helicopter platform, but no maintenance facilities. It has a complement of eighty-nine civilians (nineteen officers), twenty-nine spare crew, and six United States Navy crew.

References

External links

 
 USNS Patuxent (T-AO-201)

 

Henry J. Kaiser-class oilers
Ships built in Bridge City, Louisiana
1994 ships